Raija Anne Lammila (born 6 December 1957) is a Finnish diplomat.

Career 
Lammila has been the Finnish  Ombudsman for Equal Opportunity  in the Ministry for Foreign Affairs since the autumn of 2015. Prior to that she was the Finnish Ambassador to Mexico from 2011 to 2015 and has represented Finland in nine other countries: Cuba, Haiti, Nicaragua, Honduras, Guatemala, El Salvador, Costa Rica, Panama and Belize.

Previously, she has worked at the Finnish Embassies in Brazil, Madrid, Paris (Unesco) and Washington. In 2015, the House of Representative  of the  Mexican Congress  inaugurated her as an honorary doctorate as her work for   children and young people to have  right for education.

Personal life 
Since the 1980s Anne Lammila has been married to journalist Markku Saksa.

References 

Ambassadors of Finland to Mexico
Ambassadors of Finland to Cuba
Ambassadors of Finland to Haiti
Ambassadors of Finland to Nicaragua
Ambassadors of Finland to Honduras
Ambassadors of Finland to Guatemala
Ambassadors of Finland to El Salvador
Ambassadors of Finland to Costa Rica
Ambassadors of Finland to Panama
Ambassadors of Finland to Belize
1957 births
Living people
Finnish women ambassadors